KALZ (96.7 FM) is a commercial radio station licensed to Fowler, California, and serving the Fresno metropolitan area.  It airs a talk radio format and is owned by iHeartMedia, Inc.   The studios and offices are located on Shaw Avenue in North Fresno.  Programming is simulcast on sister station KRZR 1400 AM in Visalia.

KALZ has an effective radiated power (ERP) of 25,000 watts.  The transmitter tower is on South Bliss Drive in the Roosevelt neighborhood of Fresno.  The station broadcasts using HD Radio technology.  The HD-2 digital subchannel carries a classic alternative rock format known as "Alternative Rewind Radio."

Programming
KALZ and KRZR mostly carry nationally syndicated conservative talk shows from co-owned Premiere Networks.  Weekdays begin with Glenn Beck, followed by The Clay Travis and Buck Sexton Show, Sean Hannity, Jesse Kelly, Coast to Coast AM with George Noory and Ag Life.  Two local hosts are heard in late afternoons, Trevor Carey and John Girardi.  Most hours start with world and national news from Fox News Radio.

Weekends feature shows on money, health and guns, some of which are paid brokered programming.  Syndicated weekend shows include Bill Handel on the Law and Sunday Night Live with Bill Cunningham, as well as repeats of some weekday shows.

History
On October 6, 1980, the station first signed on as KTED.  The station was originally owned by Salem Media and aired a Christian talk and teaching format.  The studios were on East Kings Canyon Road.

In 1982, the station was bought by Bilmar Communications.  The Christian format ended and the station flipped to a beautiful music format.  The call sign switched to KEZL in 1986, with the EZ representing Easy Listening music.  The KEZL call sign and easy listening format had been heard on 98.9 FM for many years before that station changed to KSOF, airing a soft adult contemporary format.  By the 1990s, KEZL made the transition to a smooth jazz format.

The station was acquired by San Antonio-based Clear Channel Communications in 2000.  Clear Channel was the forerunner to today's owner, iHeartMedia.

The station was co-owned with "Alice 102.7", which aired a mix of alternative rock and hot adult contemporary music.  In 2006, management decided to swap formats and call letters, moving Alice and the KALZ call letters to 96.7, while moving the Smooth Jazz format and KEZL call letters to 102.7.

In 2012, iHeart management decided to take several of its most popular talk shows off Cumulus Media-owned KMJ, including Sean Hannity and Rush Limbaugh, in order to launch their own news/talk station in the Fresno radio market. KALZ flipped to "Power Talk 96.7" on January 1, 2013.

Previous logo

References

External links
Power Talk 96.7 official website

ALZ
Radio stations established in 1980
1980 establishments in California
Talk radio stations in the United States
IHeartMedia radio stations